Fort Sheridan Station is one of two stations on Metra's Union Pacific North Line located in the Fort Sheridan neighborhood in Highwood, Illinois. In Metra's zone-based fare system, Fort Sheridan is located in zone F. As of 2018, Fort Sheridan is the 156th busiest of Metra's 236 non-downtown stations, with an average of 259 weekday boardings.

As of April 25, 2022, Fort Sheridan is served by 23 trains in each direction on weekdays, by 11 trains in each direction on Saturdays, and by eight trains in each direction on Sundays.

Parking at Fort Sheridan Station is maintained by the City of Highwood, and is available on both sides of the tracks. Street-side parking is available on the west side of the tracks along Western Avenue and Hyacinth Place south of West Old Elm Road, and on the east side of the tracks near both corners of West Old Elm and Sheridan roads.

Bus connections
Pace
 472 Highland Park/Highwood

References

External links
Metra - Fort Sheridan Station
North Shore Trail north of Ford Sheridan Station (Metra Railfan Photos)
Station from Old Elm Road from Google Maps Street View

Fort Sheridan

Railway stations in Lake County, Illinois
Former Chicago and North Western Railway stations
Union Pacific North Line